Franz Kemser (11 November 1910 – 20 January 1986) was a German-West German bobsledder who competed from the late 1930s to the early 1950s. He won a gold medal in the four-man competition at the 1952 Winter Olympics in Oslo.

Kemser also won three medals at the FIBT World Championships with two silvers (Two-man: 1953, Four-man: 1938) and one bronze (Four-man: 1939).

References
Bobsleigh four-man Olympic medalists for 1924, 1932–56, and since 1964
Bobsleigh two-man world championship medalists since 1931
Bobsleigh four-man world championship medalists since 1930
DatabaseOlympics.com profile

1910 births
1986 deaths
German male bobsledders
Olympic bobsledders of Germany
Bobsledders at the 1952 Winter Olympics
Olympic gold medalists for Germany
Olympic medalists in bobsleigh
Medalists at the 1952 Winter Olympics